Valer Săsărman (25 August 1969 – 29 August 2021) was a Romanian professional footballer who played as a defender. Săsărman started his career at Laminorul Beclean, but played for the rest of it for Gloria Bistrița, appearing in 329 Divizia A matches and scoring seven goals. After retirement Săsărman started his football manager career, returning to the same teams for which he played. He died on 29 August 2021, after suffering a stroke at his home from Măluț, Bistrița-Năsăud County.

Honours
Gloria Bistriţa
Divizia B: 1989–90
Cupa României: 1993–94, runner-up 1995–96
Supercupa României runner-up: 1994

Notes

References

External links

1969 births
2021 deaths
People from Bistrița-Năsăud County
Romanian footballers
Association football defenders
Liga I players
Liga II players
ACF Gloria Bistrița players
Romanian football managers
ACF Gloria Bistrița managers